Maitha Gideon Mung'aro is a Kenyan politician who has served as the governor of Kilifi County since August 2022. As a member of the Coalition for Reforms and Democracy and the Orange Democratic Movement, he was elected to represent Kilifi North Constituency in the National Assembly in the 2013 parliamentary election. He was the chairman of the African Union Parliamentary Group. He was also the chief whip, succeeding Jakoyo Midiwo. He was a member of the Parliamentary House Business Committee (Housekeeping), Committee on Selection (Housekeeping) and the Lands Committee (Departmental). He is also a former mayor of Malindi and represented Malindi Constituency in parliament before it was split.

References

Living people
Year of birth missing (living people)
Orange Democratic Movement politicians
Members of the 11th Parliament of Kenya